Scout Releases were an indie-label from Aachen, Germany, active in the mid-1990s.

Notable bands
 The Fall  – The Legendary Chaos Tape
 Sally Timms – To the Land of Milk and Honey, It Says Here
 Ashtray Boy – The Honeymoon Suite
 The Handsome Family, The Odessa, Milk and Scissors, Invisible Hands
 The Mekons and Kathy Acker – Pussy, King of the Pirates
 Jonboy Langford and the Pine Valley Cosmonauts – Misery Loves Company
 Delta Of Venus – Neutral A
 Dave-id Busaras – Smegma 'Structions Don't Rhyme
 Big Red Kite – Short Stories

References

German record labels